Streptocephalus proboscideus, sometimes called the Sudanese fairy shrimp, is a species of fairy shrimp found in eastern Africa.

Characteristics
S. proboscideus may reach  in length. The colouring varies from translucent to almost black. The Latin name, Streptocephalus proboscideus, means "twisted head with a proboscis", referring to a median appendage on the head between the antennae. The male antennae are the main identification feature of this species.

S. proboscideus may live as long as 9 months under laboratory conditions.

Ecology
The Sudanese fairy shrimp is found in shallow rain pools where it may form huge swarms. Its eggs may lie dormant in dry mud for several years. This fairy shrimp is an omnivore that can filter particles as small as yeast cells or as large as 0.2 mm. It may also eat nauplii of its own species or other species indiscriminately.

Life cycle
An S. proboscideus nauplius turns into a mature individual in less than two weeks. The female produces clutches of 100–300 eggs. An average female may produce 35–40 such clutches in her lifetime. She must be fertilised after each clutch.

References
Grzimek's Animal Life Encyclopedia. Volume 2 — Protostomes.

Further reading

Branchiopoda
Freshwater crustaceans of Africa
Crustaceans described in 1873
Taxa named by Georg Ritter von Frauenfeld